John William Blanchard (9 February 1889 – 1963) was an English footballer who played as a full-back.

References

1889 births
1963 deaths
Footballers from Grimsby
English footballers
Association football fullbacks
Grimsby Town F.C. players
Grimsby Rangers F.C. players
Fulham F.C. players
English Football League players